The Aeralis Advanced Jet Trainer is an advanced jet trainer aircraft designed by Aeralis in the United Kingdom. It is the initial variant of a family of modular aircraft which are reconfigurable to cover a variety of roles, including operational training, basic jet training, aerobatics/display and light combat. Aeralis plan to carry out a first flight of the advanced jet trainer variant in 2024.

The Royal Air Force has contributed funding towards the aircraft's research and development via its Rapid Capabilities Office as a potential replacement for its aging BAE Systems Hawk aircraft.

Design and development
The Advanced Jet Trainer (AJT) is the initial variant of a family of light jet aircraft which share approximately 85% of their components, including avionics, digital systems and core fuselage. The rest of the aircraft, including engine pods, wings and tail, can be interchanged to meet different roles. According to Aeralis, this system of modularity and fleet rationalisation is intended to deliver lower costs and increased flexibility to its end-user. The roles deliverable by the Aeralis system include advanced jet trainer, basic jet trainer, operational trainer, aerobatics/display and light combat.

The project was first revealed to the public in 2015 under the name DART. In 2019, Aeralis partnered with engineering and design consultancy firm Atkins to work on two out of three planned variants of the aircraft: the advanced jet trainer and the basic jet trainer.

In February 2021, Aeralis was awarded a three year contract with the Royal Air Force's Rapid Capabilities Office to further develop the aircraft. This was followed by a Teaming Agreement with Thales UK in March 2021 to further develop training and simulation systems.

In September 2021, Aeralis showcased a number of potential future variants, including an uncrewed combat variant and an uncrewed refuelling variant. It also announced that it had received a £10.5 million cash injection from an unnamed Middle Eastern nation, later revealed to be the Qatar-based Barzan Holdings, which it said was a sign the aircraft was gaining international interest. During the same month, Aeralis also signed a Memorandum of Understanding (MoU) with Rolls-Royce to supply engines for the aircraft. Atkins and Siemens also agreed to collaborate with Aeralis on Aerside, the aircraft's digital system.

In March 2022, two UK-produced, full-scale mock-ups of the aircraft appeared at the DIMDEX conference in Qatar. The mock-ups were revealed by the Emir of Qatar, Sheikh Tamim bin Hamad Al Thani, in a ceremony attended by representatives of Barzan Holdings and senior figures of the British and Qatari governments. International delegations from India, South Korea and Indonesia were also in attendance.
 
In April 2022, Aeralis received another significant investment from the RAF, initiating Phase 2 of the programme which evaluated the potential of PYRAMID, the UK Ministry of Defence's (MOD) open mission architecture. Aeralis also engaged with the MOD and its procurement arm, Defence Equipment and Support (DE&S) to explore the potential of Aeralis within the framework of the RAF's Future Combat Air Systems (FCAS) initiative. A model underwent wind tunnel testing by Airbus UK in October 2022.

References

External links 
 Aeralis website
 PYRAMID Programme

Proposed aircraft of the United Kingdom
Proposed military aircraft